"Pain"  is a song by Canadian rock band Three Days Grace. It was released on September 19, 2006 as the second single from their second studio album, One-X.

Background
According to former vocalist Adam Gontier, "Pain" is "a song about feeling like you're constantly numb to things around you, thanks to your own actions, and it's about being sick of that feeling."

There are three versions of the song "Pain". The first version is the album version of song. The second version is an acoustic version of "Pain" that is available for download along with an acoustic version of "Animal I Have Become" on most online music stores including iTunes. The third version runs 3:28 long and is titled "Pain (Pleasure Mix)". The song was serviced to contemporary hit radio on June 3, 2008.

Chart performance
"Pain" has become the band's biggest hit to date. It reached number one on the Billboard Modern Rock Tracks chart for four consecutive weeks, becoming their biggest hit on that chart to date. It stayed on the chart for 30 weeks where the prior single "Animal I Have Become" and next single, "Never Too Late" stayed longer on the chart at 41 weeks and 43 weeks respectively. On the Billboard Hot Mainstream Rock Tracks chart, it reached number one and stayed there for thirteen consecutive weeks. It also hit number 44 on the Billboard Hot 100, becoming their first single to chart in the top 50 of the Hot 100 and their highest charting single to date.

"Pain" also held the number one spot on many Canadian rock stations for weeks, and was the most-requested song ten weeks in a row. It also reached number one on the MuchMusic Countdown.

The song was featured on episodes of Criminal Minds, CSI: NY, and Ghost Whisperer, and is a playable song in the music video games Rock Revolution and Rock Band 3.

Music video
The music video, directed by Tony Petrossian, features the band playing the song in what looks to be an abandoned mansion or warehouse, and it also features shots of troubled youths who are lip-syncing to the song. At the end of the song, everyone (youths and the band members alike) is shown to be tattooed with a red "X" on the back of their necks, signifying the name of the parent album, One-X.

Pain EP
The Pain EP is a digital exclusive. It features the main version of "Pain" along with stripped acoustic versions of both "Pain" and "Animal I Have Become".

 "Pain" – 3:22
 "Pain (stripped acoustic version)" – 3:18
 "Animal I Have Become (stripped acoustic version)" – 3:44

Awards and nominations
"Pain" was nominated for "Best International Video By A Canadian" at the 2007 MuchMusic Video Awards and won the BMI Awards in 2006 along with their other single "Animal I Have Become". The song won a BDS Certified Spin Award based on the 100,000 spins it received. Billboard ranked the song at number 25 on their "Greatest of All Time Mainstream Rock Songs" list.

Personnel
Adam Gontier – lead vocals
Brad Walst – bass guitar, backing vocals 
Neil Sanderson – drums, organ, backing vocals
Barry Stock – lead guitar

Charts

Weekly charts

Year-end charts

All-time charts

Certifications

Release history

References

External links

2006 singles
2006 songs
Three Days Grace songs
Jive Records singles
Songs about suicide
Music videos directed by Tony Petrossian
Songs written by Adam Gontier
Songs about depression